Ceryx toxotes is a moth of the subfamily Arctiinae. It was described by George Hampson in 1898. It is found in South Africa.

References

Endemic moths of South Africa
Ceryx (moth)
Moths described in 1898